Fu Nai (AD 1758-1811), courtesy name Chong'an (重庵), was a Qing dynasty statesman born during the reign of the Qianlong Emperor. He made himself famous by his skillful treatment of the aborigines of Hunan. He first conquered and disarmed them, and then set to work to teach them to cultivate the arts of peace. He was particularly successful as a military leader, though himself actually a civilian. In 1809 he rose to be Judge in Hunan, and was ordered, by special request of the aborigines, to visit their territory once a year.

See also 
 Miao Rebellion 1795-1806

References

1758 births
1811 deaths
Qing dynasty politicians from Beijing
Political office-holders in Hunan